Aglish is a village in County Waterford, Ireland.

Aglish may also refer to several other places in Ireland:*

 A townland in County Clare; see List of townlands of County Clare
 Aglish, County Cork, a civil parish
 A townland in County Kerry; see List of townlands of County Kerry
 A townland in County Mayo; see List of townlands of County Mayo
 Aglish, County Tipperary, a small settlement

* 'Aglish' is from the Irish 'Eaglais', meaning 'church'